Ewa Wanda Wolak (born 1 June 1960 in Wrocław) is a Polish politician. She was elected to the Sejm on 25 September 2005, getting 3465 votes in 3 Wrocław district as a candidate from the Civic Platform list. She ended her term in 2015.

See also
Members of Polish Sejm 2005-2007

External links
Ewa Wolak - parliamentary page - includes declarations of interest, voting record, and transcripts of speeches.

Members of the Polish Sejm 2005–2007
Women members of the Sejm of the Republic of Poland
Civic Platform politicians
1960 births
Living people
21st-century Polish women politicians
Members of the Polish Sejm 2007–2011
Members of the Polish Sejm 2011–2015